La Broque is a commune in the Bas-Rhin department in the Grand Est region in Northeastern France. In 2018, it had a population of 2,646.

See also
Communes of the Bas-Rhin department

References

Communes of Bas-Rhin
Bas-Rhin communes articles needing translation from French Wikipedia
Salm-Salm